The High Com (also as HIGH COM, both written with a thin space) noise reduction system was developed by Telefunken, Germany, in the 1970s as a high quality high compression analogue compander for audio recordings.

High Com 

The idea of a compander for consumer devices was based on studies of a fixed two-band compander by Jürgen Wermuth of AEG-Telefunken ELA, Wolfenbüttel, developer of the Telefunken  (formally abbreviated as "TEL" in professional broadcasting) four-band audio compander for professional use. In April 1974, the resulting "RUSW-200" prototype first led to the development of a sliding two-band compander by Ernst F. Schröder of Telefunken Grundlagenlaboratorium, Hannover since July 1974.

However, the finally released High Com system, which was marketed by Telefunken since 1978, worked as a broadband 2:1:2 compander, achieving almost 15 dB of noise reduction for low and up to 20 dB RMS A-weighted for higher frequencies, reducing the noise power down to 1% while avoiding most of the acoustic problems observed with other high compression broadband companders such as EMT/NoiseBX,  or dbx.

The chip contained more than 500 transistors.

With minimal changes in the external circuitry the IC could also be used to emulate a mostly Dolby B-compatible compander as in the DNR (Dynamic Noise Reduction) system for backward compatibility. Consequently, second-generation tape decks with High Com incorporated a DNR expander as well, whereas in some late-generation Telefunken, ASC and Universum tape decks this even worked during recording, but was left undocumented for legal reasons.

High-Com II and III 
Nakamichi, one of the more than 25 licensees of the High Com system, supported the development of a noise reduction system that could exceed the capabilities of the then-prevalent Dolby B-type system. However, it became apparent that a single-band compander without sliding-band technology, which was protected by Dolby patents, suffered too many audible artifacts. So, High Com was further developed into the two-band High Com II and three-band High Com III 2:1:2 systems by Werner Scholz and Ernst F. Schröder of Telefunken assisted by Harron K. Appleman of Nakamichi in 1978/1979. The two-band variant was eventually released exclusively as Nakamichi High-Com II Noise Reduction System later in 1979, increasing the amount of noise reduction on analogue recordings and transmissions by as much as 25 dB A-weighted.

High-Com II for vinyl 
While originally designed for tape recordings, Nakamichi demonstrated the usage of High Com II on vinyl records as well in 1979.

In 1982, the same AEG-Telefunken team, who designed the High Com noise reduction system, also developed the IC U2141B for the CBS Laboratories CX noise reduction system for vinyl records, a system also incorporated into FMX, a noise reduction system for FM broadcasting developed by CBS.

High Com FM 
Similar to the earlier Dolby FM system in the US, a High Com FM system was evaluated in Germany between July 1979 and December 1981 by IRT. It was also considered to be adopted for AM broadcasting. It was based on the High Com broadband compander, but eventually changed to achieve 10 dB(A) only to improve compatibility with the existing base of receivers without built-in expander. The system was field-trialed in public German FM broadcasting between 1981 and 1984 and also discussed as an option to be introduced in Austria and France. However, despite the improvements it was eventually not introduced commercially because of the listening artifacts it created for receivers without expander.

Impact 
In 1981 and 1982, do-it-yourself High Com kits were introduced from elektor (elektor compander/Hi-Fi-Kompander) and  Amtron (micro line High-Com System UK 512 (W)). The only compander available for High-Com II was Nakamichi's own High-Com II unit.

More than one million High Com systems were sold between 1978 and 1982. While implemented in dozens of European and Japanese consumer device models and acoustically much superior to other systems such as Dolby B, C, dbx,  or Super D, the High Com family of systems never gained a similar market penetration. This was caused by several factors, including the existing pre-dominance of the Dolby system, with Dolby Laboratories introducing the "good enough" Dolby C update (with up to 15 dB A-weighted improvement) in 1980 as well, and also by the fact that High Com required higher quality tape decks and tapes to work with in order to give satisfactory results.
High-Com II even required calibration of the playback level using a 400 Hz, 0 dB, 200 nWb/m calibration tone for optimum results, and with prices in the several hundred dollars for the external Nakamichi compander box it was much too expensive to be used by many people outside the small group of audiophiles using high-end tape recorders or open-reel decks.
When AEG-Telefunken struggled financially in 1981/1982 and the Hannover development site was partially disbanded and refocused on digital technologies in 1983, this also put the High Com development to an end. The latest tape decks to come with High Com were produced in 1986.

Several software decoders were developed for telcom c4 and High Com, and are considered to be implemented for High-Com II

Tape decks with High Com 
These tape decks are known to provide built-in support for High Com:

 Akai GX-F37
 ASC AS 3000
 Rosita Audion D 700
 Blaupunkt XC-240, XC-1400
 ELIN Professional Micro Component Cassette Deck - Modell TC-97
 Eumig FL-1000µP High Com
 Filtronic FSK-200
 Grundig MCF 200, MCF 600, CF 5100, SCF 6200
  Mini Altus HiFi-System Micro Component Stereo Cassette Deck
 Hitachi D-E75 DB/SL
 Imperial TD 6100
 Intel Professional Micro Component Cassette Deck - Modell TC-97
  C 102, C 220
 Revox B710 High Com
  Palladium Mico Line 2000C
 Nikko ND-500H
 nippon TD-3003
 Saba CD278, CD 362, CD 363
 Schneider SL 7270 C
 Sencor SD-6650
 Siemens RC 333, RC 300
 Studer A710 High Com
 Telefunken TC 750, TC 450, TC 450M, TC 650, TC 650M, STC 1 / CC 20, MC 1, MC 2, HC 700, HC 800, HC 1500, HC 3000, HC 750M, HC 730T, RC 100, RC 200, RC 300, Hifi Studio 1, Hifi Studio 1M, Studio Center 5004, Studio Center 5005, Studio Center 7004
 Tensai TFL-812
 Uher CG 321, CG 325, CG 344, CG 356, CG 365, mini-hit
   Senator CT 2307, Senator CT 2307A, CT 2318 (for SYSTEM HIFI 7500 SL), Senator CT 2337, Senator VTCF 407
 Wangine K-3M, WSK-120, WSK-220

Other devices can be used with an external High Com compander box.

See also 
 CX (Compatible Expansion), another disk noise reduction system
 dbx, a competing noise reduction system
 Dolby noise reduction system
 Dolby SR (Spectral Recording)
 Dynamic Noise Reduction (DNR), a playback-only noise reduction system often confused with Dolby
 FMX (broadcasting), another FM noise reduction system
 UC (Universal Compatible), another disk noise reduction system

Notes

References

Further reading 
  (NB. This article mixes up the Dolby curve.)
 
 
 
 
 
   
  
 
  
 
 
 
 
 
 
 
 
  [https://web.archive.org/web/20210310024619/https://worldradiohistory.com/Archive-All-Audio/Archive-Modern-Recording/80s/Modern-Recording-1980-10.pdf]
 
 
 
 
 
   (3 pages)
  
  (3 pages)
  (3 pages)
   (3+13 pages)

External links
 https://www.radiomuseum.org/r/thomsen_el_high_com_rauschunterdrueckung_hobby_com.html
 http://www.tonbandhobby.de/high-com.htm#aiwa
 http://haisen.cool.coocan.jp/garakuta/AV/audio/NR.htm

Magnetic tape noise reduction systems